Louis André Lagrange (8 October 1804 – 29 September 1861) was a French naval commissioner who was twice acting governor of Martinique.

Life

Early years (1804–53)
Louis André Lagrange was born on 8 October 1804 in Saint-Pierre, Martinique.
His parents were André François Lagrange, naval commissioner (commissaire de marine) and Anne Eulalie Aney.
He joined the navy on 1 March 1822, and became a commis de marine (naval clerk) on 7 July 1826.
Lagrange became a sous-commissaire (sub commissioner) on 9 February 1841.
In October 1845 he was commissaire des travaux et approvisionnements (commissioner of works and supplies) in Martinique.
He was named a Knight of the Legion of Honour on 3 May 1849.
He was promoted to commissaire adjoint (deputy commissioner) on 10 May 1849.

Commissioner (1853–61)

Lagrange was promoted to commissaire on 30 July 1853.
In January 1855 Lagrange was ordonnateur (head of the administration) of Martinique.
Lagrange was appointed acting governor of Martinique on 17 July 1856 in place of Louis Henri de Gueydon.
On 12 December 1856 he handed over to governor Armand Louis Joseph Denis de Fitte de Soucy.
Lagrange was made an officer of the Legion of Honour on 12 August 1857.
In December 1857 he was ordonnateur of Martinique.
On 14 January 1859 he was again appointed acting governor in place of de Fitte de Soucy.
On 2 June 1859 he handed over to governor Antoine Marie Ferdinand de Maussion de Candé.
In 1860 he was ordonnateur of Martinique.
Lagrange died on 29 September 1861 at the age of 56.

Notes

Sources

1804 births
1861 deaths
Governors of Martinique